Lake Estes is a reservoir in Estes Park, Colorado created by Olympus Dam. The reservoir lies on the Big Thompson River and is a component of the Colorado-Big Thompson Project. Lake Estes sits at 7,522 feet in elevation with approximately 4 miles of shoreline within Larimer County.

References 

Estes
Estes Park, Colorado
Estes